Dendropsophus sartori (common name: Taylor's yellow treefrog) is a species of frog in the family Hylidae. It is endemic to Mexico and occurs on the Pacific slopes of southwestern Mexico in Jalisco, Guerrero, and Oaxaca.
Its natural habitats are lowland dry tropical forests. It breeds during the rainy season when it is commonly found in temporary ponds. It is a common species but its habitat is being lost.

References

sartori
Endemic amphibians of Mexico
Amphibians described in 1951
Taxa named by Hobart Muir Smith
Taxonomy articles created by Polbot